Smögen is a locality in Sotenäs Municipality, Västra Götaland County, Sweden with 1,329 inhabitants in 2010. It is one of the liveliest "summer towns" of the Swedish west coast.

The community actually straddled several islands that lay so close together that the space in between has since been filled, and is now considered as a single island. The southern part consists mostly of Smögen Island, which lies in the centre. Around this lies to the south Kleven, in the northwest Sandön, and in the northeast, Hasselön. The town is connected to the neighbouring town Kungshamn by Smögenbron (Smögen Bridge).

History 
Smögen is mentioned for the first time towards the end of the 16th century. The name of the community has varied over the years; amongst other names, from "Smögit", "Smöenn", "Smöget" and "Smygesund". The name has probably come from the Swedish word , which translates as "sneak-hole" or "nook", referring to the narrow inlet between the Smögen island and where the harbour lies. Around the 17th century, the island Hasselön was populated, and through the years this community has grown together with Smögen, and is today considered a part of the Smögen community.

Tourism 
Smögen is one of the most popular tourist destinations on the Swedish west coast, well known for its fish, prawns and other seafood, and one of Sweden's few fish markets is located here. There is also an extensive nightlife scene, with many bars, clubs and concert venues open during the summer.

References 

Populated places in Västra Götaland County
Populated places in Sotenäs Municipality
Former Norwegian populated places